The 2022–23 Saudi Third Division was the second season of the Saudi Third Division since its inception in 2021. The season started on 3 November 2022 and concluded with the final on 10 March 2023. The group stage draw was held on 8 June 2022.

The final was played on 10 March 2023 between Al-Noor and Mudhar. Mudhar defeated Al-Noor 1–0 to win their first title.

Overview

Changes
On 14 April 2022, the Saudi FF announced that the number of teams in the Third Division would increase from 32 to 40 teams. To prepare for this change, only 4 teams would be relegated to the Fourth Division and 14 teams would be promoted to the Third Division. In addition, 6 teams would be promoted to the Second Division and only 4 would be relegated from the Second Division.

Team changes
A total of 32 teams are contesting the league, including 22 sides from the 2021–22 season, 4 relegated teams from the Second Division, and 6 promoted teams from the Fourth Division.

The following teams have changed division since the 2021–22 season

To Third Division

Promoted from the Fourth Division

 Al-Khaldi
 Al-Tasamoh
 Al-Sawari
 Al-Waseel
 Al-Tuhami
 Ras Tanura

Relegated from Second Division
 Al-Dahab
 Afif
 Al-Nojoom
 Al-Thoqbah

From Third Division
Promoted to Second Division
 Al-Suqoor
 Al-Qous
 Jerash
 Sajer
 Qilwah
 Al-Shaeib

Relegated to the Fourth Division
 Al-Fursan
 Kumait
 Al-Entelaq
 Al-Fao

Teams
;Group A

Group B

Group C

Group D

Group A

League table

Results

Group B

League table

Results

Group C

League table

Results

Group D

League table

Results

Play-offs

Championship play-offs

Semi-finals

Final

Promotion play-offs

Al-Nojoom won 2–1 on aggregate.

2–2 on aggregate. Al-Houra won 4–2 on penalties.

Statistics

Top scorers

Hat-tricks 

Note
(H) – Home; (A) – Away

Number of teams by province

See also
 2022–23 Saudi Professional League
 2022–23 Saudi First Division League
 2022–23 Saudi Second Division

References

4
Saudi Third Division seasons